Vicente Piquer Mora (24 February 1935 – 1 March 2018) was a Spanish football right back and manager.

He played 341 competitive matches with Valencia, in a 12-year professional career.

Club career
Born in Algar de Palancia, Valencian Community, Piquer finished his development at local club Valencia CF. He started playing as a senior with the reserves in Segunda División and, on 24 February 1957, he made his La Liga debut for the first team in a 2–3 away loss against FC Barcelona. He scored his first goal in the latter competition in the next fixture, as the hosts beat Real Sociedad, 3–2; he added six appearances in the Copa del Generalísimo to help the side reach the semi-finals.

In the following years, Piquer was a regular for the Che, notably starting in all 18 games as they won consecutive editions of the Inter-Cities Fairs Cup. During his spell, he earned a reputation for his man-marking of Real Madrid's Francisco Gento.

Piquer retired in 1968 at the age of 33, following two years in the second level with CD Málaga and one with amateurs SD Sueca. He then worked as a manager, almost exclusively in the lower leagues and in his native region.

International career
Piquer won one cap for Spain, during a 1–1 friendly draw to France played in Paris on 10 December 1961.

Death
Piquer died in his hometown on 1 March 2018 at 83, following a long illness.

Honours
Valencia
Inter-Cities Fairs Cup: 1961–62, 1962–63

References

External links
 
 
 CiberChe stats and bio 
 Stats at Amigos Malaguistas 
 

1935 births
2018 deaths
People from Camp de Morvedre
Sportspeople from the Province of Valencia
Spanish footballers
Footballers from the Valencian Community
Association football defenders
La Liga players
Segunda División players
Valencia CF players
CD Málaga footballers
Spain B international footballers
Spain international footballers
Spanish football managers
Segunda División managers
Segunda División B managers
Albacete Balompié managers
Levante UD managers
UD Barbastro managers